Suzdalsky Uyezd (Суздальский уезд) was one of the subdivisions of the Vladimir Governorate of the Russian Empire. It was situated in the northern part of the governorate. Its administrative centre was Suzdal.

Demographics
At the time of the Russian Empire Census of 1897, Suzdalsky Uyezd had a population of 107,708. Of these, 99.9% spoke Russian as their native language.

References

 
Uezds of Vladimir Governorate
Vladimir Governorate